The 2018–19 Houston Cougars men's basketball team represented the University of Houston during the 2018–19 NCAA Division I men's basketball season. The Cougars were led by fifth-year head coach Kelvin Sampson as members of the American Athletic Conference. Beginning December 1, 2018, they played their home games at Fertitta Center, which reopened after a $60 million upgrade. The Cougars played their first four non-conference home games at H&PE Arena while construction on Fertitta Center was completed.

Houston finished the 2018–19 regular season 29–2, including an AAC-best 16–2 record in conference play. They were the runner-up in the American Athletic Conference tournament, falling 69–57 to Cincinnati in the final. The Cougars earned the #3 seed in the Midwest Region of the NCAA tournament, where they went 2–1, advancing to the Sweet Sixteen before falling 62–58 to Kentucky.  Houston's final overall season record of 33–4 set a program record for wins.

Previous season
The Cougars finished the 2017–18 season 27–8, 14–4 in AAC play to finish in a tie for second place. As the No. 3 seed in the AAC tournament, they defeated UCF and Wichita State before losing to Cincinnati in the championship game. The Cougars received an at-large bid to the NCAA tournament as the No. 6 seed in the West region. They defeated San Diego State in the First Round before losing to eventual National Runner-up Michigan in the Second Round.

Offseason

Departures

Incoming transfers

2018 recruiting class

Roster

Schedule and results

|-
!colspan=12 style=| Exhibition

|-
!colspan=12 style=| Non-conference regular season

|-
!colspan=12 style=| AAC regular season

|-
!colspan=12 style=| AAC Tournament

|-
!colspan=9 style=| NCAA tournament

Rankings

References

Houston
Houston Cougars men's basketball seasons
Houston
Houston
Houston